Demery as a surname originates from the Duchy of Normandy, in France, where the Demery family was established.

Spelling variations of this family name include: Demers, Demere, Demerre, Demery, Dimery, Dimry, Demerey, Demerais, Demeret, Demerez, Lemers, Lemere, Lemerre, Lemery, Lemerey, Lemerais, Lemeret, Lemerez, Desmery, Démery, Lesmery, Lémery, Lamer, Lamers, Lamere, Lamerre, Lamery, Lamerais, Lameret, Merre, Mérais, Méret, Mérey, Méry, Merrée, Mériaux, Mériau, Mériel, Mériet, Méric, Mérigon, Mérigot, Mériguet, Mérigeau and many more.

List of persons with the surname
Ben Demery (b. 1986), Australian Paralympic tandem cyclist
Larry Demery (b. 1953), American baseball player
Jericho Brown born Nelson Demery III (b. 1976), American poet and writer
Rodney Demery, American author, TV host, and former police detective
Thomas Demery (b. 1949), American, former Assistant Secretary of the U.S. Department of Housing and Urban Development
Nichola Lashawn Demery (Dimry) (b. 1973), Senior Legal Analyst, California Department of Justice

References

Surnames